Hovsta is a locality and a parish situated in Örebro Municipality, Örebro County, Sweden with 2,785 inhabitants in 2010.

Notable people

Sofia Helin (born 25 April 1972), a Swedish actress best known for her role as Saga Norén in The Bridge, was born in Hovsta.

References 

Populated places in Örebro Municipality